Jeffrey P. Evangelos (born November 3, 1952) is an American politician from Maine. Evangelos is an unenrolled (independent) member of the Maine House of Representatives. He was elected in November 2012 to represent District 49, which includes the towns of Cushing, Union, Warren and his residence in Friendship, all of which are in Knox County. He ran against a Republican in a two-way race and won with 55% of the vote. During the campaign, a conservative PAC sent out mailers criticizing Evangelos for his positions on former President George W. Bush.

Evangelos was born in Concord, Massachusetts and earned a B.S. in economics and history from Brockport State College in Brockport, New York. Afterwards, he moved to Maine and attended the University of Maine, where he earned a M.A. in history. He then began working in the public sector, including work in rural Washington County, Maine in municipal government. He was then hired as town manager in Warren, Maine in 1976 at the age of 23.

In 2004, Evangelos was a Democratic candidate for State Representative in District 49. He lost to Republican Wesley Richardson.

In November 2013, Evangelos endorsed Democratic Congressman Mike Michaud in the 2014 gubernatorial election.

References

1952 births
Living people
People from Concord, Massachusetts
People from Knox County, Maine
Maine Independents
Maine Democrats
State University of New York at Brockport alumni
University of Maine alumni
Maine city managers
Members of the Maine House of Representatives
21st-century American politicians